Barbara Ann Mikulski (born July 20, 1936) is an American politician and social worker who served as a United States senator from Maryland from 1987 to 2017. A member of the Democratic Party, she also served in the United States House of Representatives from 1977 to 1987. Mikulski is the third-longest-serving female United States Senator, and the longest-serving U.S. Senator in Maryland history.

Raised in the Fell's Point neighborhood of East Baltimore, Mikulski attended Mount Saint Agnes College and the University of Maryland School of Social Work.  Originally a social worker and community organizer, she was elected to the Baltimore City Council in 1971 after delivering a highly publicized address on the "ethnic movement" in America.  She was elected to the House of Representatives in 1976, and in 1986, she became the first woman elected to the United States Senate from Maryland.

From the death of Senator Daniel Inouye in December 2012 until 2015, Mikulski chaired the Senate Appropriations Committee. She was the first woman and first Marylander to hold the position. At her retirement, she was the ranking minority member of the committee.  She also served on the Health, Education, Labor, and Pensions Committee and the Select Committee on Intelligence.

On March 2, 2015, Mikulski announced that she would retire after five terms in the Senate and would not seek reelection in 2016. In January 2017, Mikulski joined Johns Hopkins University as a professor of public policy and advisor to University President Ronald J. Daniels.

Early life, education, and career
Mikulski was born and raised in the Fell's Point neighborhood of East Baltimore, the eldest of the three daughters of Christine Eleanor (née Kutz) and William Mikulski. Her parents were both of Polish descent; her immigrant great-grandparents had owned a bakery in Baltimore.  During her high school years at the Institute of Notre Dame, she worked in her parents' grocery store, delivering groceries to elderly neighbors who were unable to leave their homes.

After graduating with a Bachelor of Arts in Sociology from Mount Saint Agnes College (now a part of Loyola University Maryland) in 1958, she obtained her master's degree in social work (MSW) from the University of Maryland School of Social Work in 1965.  She worked as a social worker for Catholic charities and Baltimore's Department of Social Services, helping at-risk children and educating seniors about the Medicare program. Mikulski became an activist social worker when she heard about plans to build Interstate 95 through Baltimore's Fells Point and Canton neighborhoods. She helped organize communities on both sides of the city and successfully fought to stop the construction of the road. Her efforts to prevent the highway from running through Southeast Baltimore also resulted in the establishment of the Southeast Community Organization, a non-profit which worked to improve Baltimore neighborhoods.

Early political career
Mikulski first received national attention in 1970 because of her remarks at a conference at The Catholic University of America regarding "Ethnic Americans" convened by Msgr. Geno Baroni. Her message became one of the major documents of the "ethnic movement". Mikulski's remarks included the following:

Mikulski's activism led to a seat on the Baltimore City Council in 1971. In 1973 incoming Chairperson of the Democratic National Committee Robert S. Strauss appointed then Baltimore City Councilperson Mikulski to chair the Democratic Party Commission on New Delegate Selection and Party Structure.  She was instrumental in solidifying democratizing reforms to the national delegate selection process.

U.S. House of Representatives

In 1976, Paul Sarbanes gave up his seat in Maryland's 3rd congressional district to make a successful run for the Senate.  Mikulski won a crowded seven-way Democratic primary—the key election given a heavily Democratic district—and won easily in the November elections.  She was reelected four more times, never facing substantive opposition.

U.S. Senate

Elections

Mikulski first ran for the U.S. Senate in 1974, winning the Democratic nomination to face Republican incumbent Charles Mathias. Although well known to residents in her city, Mikulski had limited name recognition in the rest of the state.

As an advocate for campaign finance reform, Mathias refused to accept any contribution over $100 to "avoid the curse of big money that has led to so much trouble in the last year". However, he still managed to raise over $250,000, nearly five times Mikulski's total. Ideologically, Mikulski and Mathias agreed on many issues, such as closing tax loopholes and easing taxes on the middle class. On two issues, however, Mathias argued to reform Congress and the U.S. tax system to address inflation and corporate price fixing, contrary to Mikulski. In retrospect, The Washington Post felt the election was "an intelligent discussion of state, national, and foreign affairs by two smart, well-informed people".

With Maryland voters, Mathias benefited from his frequent disagreements with the Nixon administration and his liberal voting record. On November 5, 1974, he was re-elected by a 57% to 43% margin, though he lost badly in Baltimore City and Baltimore County, where Mikulski was popular. This election is the only election that Mikulski has ever lost.

Mathias announced his retirement before the 1986 elections. At the time of this announcement, it was expected that then-Governor Harry Hughes would be the favorite to succeed Mathias. However, Hughes became caught up in the aftermath of the Maryland savings and loan crisis. He lost popularity with voters, opening the door for Mikulski's bid for the Senate. The Republican nominee was Linda Chavez, who left her post as Assistant to the President for Public Liaison in an attempt to win the seat. The election was the second time in modern U.S. history that two women faced each other in a statewide general election. The race was covered by national media, with observers noting that Chavez was very unlikely to win.

In the campaign, Chavez attacked Mikulski, a lifelong Baltimore resident, as a "San Francisco-style, George McGovern, liberal Democrat". Chavez was accused of making Mikulski's sexual orientation a central issue of the political campaign. Chavez wrote that the term referred to Jeane Kirkpatrick's 1984 Republican National Convention "Blame America First" speech, in which she coined the phrase "San Francisco Liberal" in reference to the Democratic National Convention in San Francisco. Using political advertisements and press conferences, Chavez attacked Mikulski's former aide Teresa Brennan as "anti-male" and a "radical feminist", implying that Brennan and Mikulski were radical lesbians and that "fascist feminism" was Mikulski's political philosophy. Brennan had not been part of Mikulski's staff for five years, but Chavez implied Brennan was still working on Mikulski's campaign. Mikulski did not respond in kind to the attacks. She defeated Chavez with 61% of the vote. She also served alongside Paul Sarbanes, the man she'd succeeded in the House.

Mikulski, popularly known as "Senator Barb", was re-elected with large majorities in 1992, 1998, 2004, and 2010. Having won re-election in 2010, she has surpassed Margaret Chase Smith as the longest-serving female senator. ABC News named Mikulski its Person of the Week for that milestone. On March 17, 2012, she became the longest-serving female member of Congress in the history of the United States, surpassing the previous record-holder, Rep. Edith Nourse Rogers of Massachusetts, who served from 1925 to 1960.

In September 2009, the "tell-all" book The Clinton Tapes revealed that during the 2000 presidential election, President Bill Clinton suggested Mikulski as a running mate for Al Gore, who instead chose his colleague Joe Lieberman. In 2007, Mikulski endorsed her colleague, Sen. Hillary Clinton (D-NY), for President of the United States, praising her as a leader and citing her desire to break the "glass ceiling" by electing the first woman president. Senator Mikulski nominated Hillary Clinton for President of the United States at the Democratic National Convention on July 26, 2016.

From 2007 to 2017, Mikulski served alongside Ben Cardin, who succeeded her in the 3rd District and held it for 20 years until succeeding Sarbanes in the Senate.

Legislation
On June 3, 2013, Mikulski introduced the Child Care and Development Block Grant Act of 2013 (S. 1086; 113th Congress), which passed in the Senate. The bill would reauthorize the Child Care and Development Block Grant Act of 1990 to provide block grants to the states to help low-income parents find child care for their children. In addition to reauthorizing the program, it also makes amendments to the law to try to improve it. Some of those improvements include required background checks on grant recipients and annual inspections. Mikulski argued that "this bill ensures that all children get the care they need and deserve."

On April 1, 2014, Mikulski introduced the Paycheck Fairness Act (S. 2199; 113th Congress),  a measure that aims to strengthen the Fair Labor Standards Act's protections against pay inequalities based on gender. It is a bill that "punishes employers for retaliating against workers who share wage information, puts the justification burden on employers as to why someone is paid less and allows workers to sue for punitive damages of wage discrimination". Mikulski said that "it brings tears to my eyes to know women are working so hard and being paid less" and that "it makes me emotional when I hear that... I get angry, I get outraged and I get volcanic".

Committee assignments
In the 114th Congress, Mikulski served on the following Senate committees (standing committees in bold):
 Committee on Appropriations (Ranking Member)
 Subcommittee on Commerce, Justice, Science, and Related Agencies (Ranking Member)
 Subcommittee on Defense
 Subcommittee on Labor, Health and Human Services, Education, and Related Agencies
 Subcommittee on State, Foreign Operations, and Related Programs
 Subcommittee on Transportation, Housing and Urban Development, and Related Agencies
 As Ranking Member of the full committee, Mikulski may serve as an ex officio member of any subcommittee of which she is not a full member
 Committee on Health, Education, Labor, and Pensions
 Subcommittee on Children and Families
 Subcommittee on Primary Health and Aging
 Select Committee on Intelligence

Other
Women were not allowed to wear pants on the U.S. Senate floor until 1993. In 1993, Senators Mikulski and Carol Moseley Braun wore pants onto the floor in defiance of the rule, and female support staff followed soon after, with the rule being amended later that year by Senate Sergeant-at-Arms Martha Pope to allow women to wear pants on the floor so long as they also wore a jacket.

In 2014, Mikulski was voted the "meanest senator" in Washingtonian's survey of congressional staffers.

Political positions
Mikulski was one of 11 senators to vote against both the 1991 and 2002 resolutions authorizing the use of force in Iraq.

Mikulski has opposed predatory lending, and has been an outspoken opponent of Fairbanks Capital (now Select Portfolio Servicing), alleged to have illegally foreclosed on over 100 homes in Maryland.

Mikulski has been an outspoken advocate for the Equal Rights Amendment. She has also spoken in support of abortion rights and has stated she does not view the opposition to this issue as misogynistic.

On October 1, 2008, Mikulski voted in favor of HR1424, the Senate version of the Emergency Economic Stabilization Act of 2008, which provided a $700 billion bailout to the United States financial market.

In October 2013, Mikulski sponsored a bill honoring naturopathic medicine.

Electoral history

Awards and honors

In 1979, the Supersisters trading card set was produced and distributed; one of the cards featured Mikulski's name and picture.

The NASA-funded Space Telescope Science Institute (STScI) in Baltimore named one of the world's largest astronomy databases after Mikulski (Barbara A. Mikulski Archive for Space Telescopes), as she was a long time champion of the Hubble and James Webb space telescopes.

In 2011, Mikulski was inducted into the National Women's Hall of Fame.

In 2012, when NASA discovered an exploding star, they named it "Supernova Mikulski" in her honor. Also in 2012, Mikulski was presented the Harriet Ross Tubman Lifetime Achievement Award by the Maryland African American Tourism Council.

On August 22, 2013 the President of Poland Bronisław Komorowski honored Mikulski with a Commander's Cross with Star of the Order of Polonia Restituta for "outstanding achievements in the development of Polish-American cooperation and activity for Poles living in the United States".

In November 2015, Mikulski was awarded the Presidential Medal of Freedom by President Barack Obama at a ceremony in the White House.

In 2020, the Senator Barbara A. Mikulski Room, with mementos and Mikulski’s Presidential Medal of Freedom, was opened in the Enoch Pratt Free Library.

On June 8, 2022, a room in the United States Capitol was named after Mikulski. It is the Barbara Mikulski room, S-115, located on the first floor of the side of the Capitol where the Senate is. It is one of the first two rooms in the Capitol to be named after women who were senators, the other being the Margaret Chase Smith room, which was named on the same day.

See also
 Virginia S. Baker
 Women in the United States House of Representatives
 Women in the United States Senate

References

External links

 
 
 “Louis Rukeyser's Election Guide,”    Maryland Public Television, The Walter J. Brown Media Archives & Peabody Awards Collection at the University of Georgia, American Archive of Public Broadcasting

|-

|-

|-

|-

|-

|-

|-

1936 births
Living people
21st-century American politicians
21st-century American women politicians
American politicians of Polish descent
American Roman Catholics
Anti-road protest
Baltimore City Council members
Commanders with Star of the Order of Polonia Restituta
Democratic Party members of the United States House of Representatives from Maryland
Democratic Party United States senators from Maryland
Female members of the United States House of Representatives
Female United States senators
Loyola University Maryland alumni
Polish-American culture in Baltimore
Presidential Medal of Freedom recipients
University of Maryland, Baltimore alumni
Women city councillors in Maryland
Equal Rights Amendment